The 1931 Kentucky Derby was the 57th running of the Kentucky Derby. The race took place on May 16, 1931. Horses Equipoise, Up, and Don Leon scratched before the race. Twenty Grand's winning time set a new Derby record (later broken). The winner was owned and bred by the Greentree Stable of Helen Hay Whitney. It marked the fourth time in the Derby's history that a woman owned the winning horse and the second time that a woman was both owner and breeder.

The 1931 Preakness Stakes was held one week prior, on May 9, making this the most recent time that the Preakness was run before the Kentucky Derby. Until the 2020 Kentucky Derby and 2020 Preakness Stakes were rescheduled to follow the 2020 Belmont Stakes due to the COVID-19 pandemic, 1931 was the most recent time that the Kentucky Derby was not the first leg of the Triple Crown.

Full results

Winning Breeder: Greentree Stable; (KY)

Payout

 The winner received a purse of $48,725 and $5,000 Gold Cup.
 Second place received $6,000.
 Third place received $3,000.
 Fourth place received $1,000.

References

1931
Kentucky Derby
Derby
May 1931 sports events